Sherlock Gnomes is a 2018 3D computer-animated mystery comedy film directed by John Stevenson. Based on the character Sherlock Holmes created by Sir Arthur Conan Doyle, the film serves as a sequel and spin-off to Gnomeo & Juliet (2011). It stars the voices of James McAvoy, Emily Blunt, Chiwetel Ejiofor, Maggie Smith, Michael Caine, Ashley Jensen, Matt Lucas, Stephen Merchant, Ozzy Osbourne, Mary J. Blige, Jamie Demetriou, and Johnny Depp. The animation was provided by Mikros Image and Reel FX Creative Studios.

The film was released in the United States on March 23, 2018, by Paramount Pictures and Metro-Goldwyn-Mayer, which replaced the previous film's distributor, Walt Disney Studios Motion Pictures (through Touchstone Pictures). It was notable for being Paramount's first animated film to be entirely animated since 2011's Rango, Paramount Animation's first film to be entirely animated, and MGM’s first animated film since 2008's Igor. It received generally negative reviews from critics and was a box office disappointment, only grossing $90.4 million worldwide against a $59 million budget.

Plot
Sherlock Gnomes and his assistant, Dr. Watson, storm London's Natural History Museum where their nemesis, a pie mascot named Moriarty, is holding gnomes hostage. After a brief battle, Moriarty is seemingly crushed by a dinosaur skeleton.

Meanwhile, now happily in love, Miss Montague, Mr Capulet and their gnomes move from Stratford-upon-Avon to London, into a run down, unkempt new garden. Lady Bluebury and Lord Redbrick announce their retirement and appoint Gnomeo & Juliet as new leaders. The couples's relationship starts to shake when Juliet becomes stressed and determined with fixing the garden up, unintentionally ignoring Gnomeo. In a bid to get her attention, Gnomeo decides to get a Cupid's Arrow orchid for the new garden so Benny shows Gnomeo the closest flower shop in town from an old computer. When Gnomeo gets the orchid in the shop, the burglar alarm goes off after a falling stall, forcing Juliet to rescue him. Once out, the couple have a heated row and Juliet angrily tells Gnomeo: "The garden can't wait and you can!". A signal on the walkie-talkie comes through of Benny saying that there is a monster in their garden. The two race back only to find everyone gone. Suddenly, Sherlock and Watson arrive and find a clue card. Juliet and Gnomeo urge the duo to tell them what's going on and Sherlock reluctantly agrees to let them tag along.

A clue from Moriarty, whom Sherlock believes survived their last encounter, leads them to Chinatown. They find the next clue at Curly Fu's Emporium, and escape a group of guards like black cats whom Sherlock had previously offended. They arrive back at the Natural History Museum, where Gnomeo suggests they look inside but Sherlock decides to visit an art gallery instead, as it helps him think. Gnomeo tries to convince him otherwise but is shocked and hurt when Juliet sides with Sherlock. The couple argue and Gnomeo storms off to the museum with Watson in pursuit. Once inside the museum, Gnomeo realises he shouldn't have left Juliet but before he can get back to her, he is kidnapped by a stone gargoyle who seemingly smashes Watson (off screen). Gnomeo is brought to the rest of the gnomes and informed they will be smashed during a fireworks celebration the following evening. Meanwhile, Sherlock figures out the next clue is at the royal park. He and Juliet disguise themselves as a squirrel to get the clue from a dog, and manage to evade the dog on a lawnmower.

Gnomeo attempts to free the gnomes, but only he and the Red Goon Gnomes are able to escape before the gargoyles arrive. The next clue leads Juliet and Sherlock to a doll shop where they meet his resentful former fiancée, Irene, who kicks them out, but allows Juliet back in after she distances herself from Sherlock. Irene gives Juliet the clue, which leads her and Sherlock to Traitor's Gate at the Tower of London. They discover Watson, apparently the true mastermind, who reveals that he pretended to be Moriarty to get through to Sherlock, who never showed respect or appreciation for him, and supposedly has the gnomes in custody, only to find them all missing. The Gargoyles reveal that they never worked for Watson, and dispose of Juliet, Sherlock and Watson on a ship.

Sherlock realizes the gnomes are being held at the bottom of the Tower Bridge with pie filling, and Moriarty appears, revealing that he really was behind everything (having manipulated Watson into helping him) and plans to smash the gnomes with the raised bridge. After witnessing Sherlock's mistreatment of Watson, he had the Gargoyles feign allegiance with Watson to access his map and identify the location of every gnome in London. Sherlock and Watson agree to work together a final time to save the gnomes, and they and Juliet head to the bridge on a drone.

Gnomeo manages to stall the bridge opening with the Red Goon Gnomes dancing, reunites with Juliet and together they defeat the Gargoyles. Although Watson frees the trapped gnomes with soap, Moriarty pursues Sherlock and injures his leg. However, just before he can kill the others, Sherlock throws himself at Moriarty, knocking them both over the bridge. Watson narrowly saves Sherlock with his cane grappling hook, whereupon Moriarty lands in the water and helplessly floats away. Afterward, the gnomes enjoy the fireworks.

The following spring, Gnomeo and Juliet happily reveal their completed garden and the gnomes celebrate with Irene and the cat guards in attendance. Sherlock and Watson leave for another adventure, friends and partners once more.

Cast
 Johnny Depp as Sherlock Gnomes: Gnome Watson's friend, Irene's ex-fiancé, Moriarty's nemesis and a gnome counterpart to Sherlock Holmes.
 Chiwetel Ejiofor as Dr. Gnome Watson: Sherlock Gnomes' friend and assistant and a gnome counterpart to Dr. John Watson.
 Emily Blunt as Juliet: Lord Redbrick's daughter, Gnomeo's wife, Nanette's best friend and a red gnomes counterpart to Juliet Capulet.
 James McAvoy as Gnomeo: Lady Bluebury's son, Juliet's husband, Benny's best friend and a blue gnome counterpart to Romeo Montague.
 Jamie Demetriou as Moriarty: Sherlock's nemesis and a pie mascot who is really evil and a counterpart to Professor Moriarty.
 Mary J. Blige as Irene: Sherlock's ex-fiancé, and a plastic doll counterpart to Irene Adler.
 Michael Caine as Lord Redbrick: the leader of the red gnomes, Juliet's former overprotective widowed father and gnome counterpart to Lord Capulet.
 Maggie Smith as Lady Bluebury: the leader of the blue gnomes, Gnomeo's widowed mother and gnome counterpart to Lady Montague.
 Ashley Jensen as Nanette: a Scottish-accented plastic garden frog, Juliet's best friend and Paris' girlfriend from the first film who is now the girlfriend of Benny and garden frog counterpart to Nurse.
 Matt Lucas as Benny: Gnomeo's impulsive and tall-hatted best friend, Call Me Doll's boyfriend from the first film who is the new boyfriend of Nanette; gnome counterpart to Mercutio and Benvolio.
Stephen Merchant as Paris: a nerdy red gnome who was arranged to marry Juliet. He is the gnome counterpart to Count Paris.
 Ozzy Osbourne as Fawn: a garden deer and counterpart to Peter.
 Julie Walters as Mrs. Montague: the elderly owner of the garden.
 Richard Wilson as Mr. Capulet: the other elderly owner of the garden.
 Julio Bonet as Mankini Gnome: a red gnome in a mankini.
 Kelly Asbury as Red Goon Gnomes: counterparts to Gregory, Sampson, Anthony, and Potpan.
 Dan Starkey as Teddy Gregson: a counterpart to Tobias Gregson.
 Dexter Fletcher as Reggie: a gargoyle.
 Javone Prince as Ronnie: a gargoyle.
 James Hong as Salt Shaker
 John Stevenson as Big Boy Gorilla
 Stephen Wight as Bridge Operator

Production

Development
In March 2012, it was reported that the film was in development at Rocket Pictures. Emily Cook, Kathy Greenberg, Andy Riley and Kevin Cecil, four of the nine writers on the first film, were to write the script for the film. Steve Hamilton Shaw and David Furnish produced the film, and Elton John, an executive producer, was again composing new songs for the film. The film would feature Sherlock Gnomes, "the greatest ornamental detective" hired by the characters from the first film, who would try to solve the mystery of disappearing gnomes.

In September 2012, it was reported that John Stevenson, one of the directors of Kung Fu Panda, had been set to direct the film. Kelly Asbury, the director of the first film, was unable to direct the sequel due to being busy on Smurfs: The Lost Village for Sony Pictures Animation. However, he was involved in the sequel as the creative consultant and he reprised his role as the Red Goon Gnomes.

Casting
In November 2015, it was announced that Johnny Depp would voice Sherlock Gnomes and that the film would be released on January 12, 2018. McAvoy and Blunt reprised their roles as Gnomeo and Juliet, respectively.

Animation
Unlike the first film, which was animated by Arc Productions (now Jam Filled Toronto), Sherlock Gnomes was animated by Mikros Image in London and Paris. Like the first film, the movie's animation was created using Maya. Sixty percent of the animation crew was in London, and the rest were in Paris. During peak production, there were between 80 and 100 animators working on the project. Animation director Eric Leighton took inspiration from George Pal’s Puppetoons for the animation of the gnomes in the film. The animation of the human characters were done via motion capture. Additional animation was produced by Reel FX Creative Studios in Dallas, Texas, and the end credits animation was produced by Studio AKA in London.

Music
Chris Bacon was confirmed to return to score the sequel like in the first film while James Newton Howard did not return to co-compose the score since he was too busy working on the music for Fantastic Beasts: The Crimes of Grindelwald. However, Howard did return only to be involved as a music consultant. The soundtrack album was released by Virgin EMI Records.

Release
The film was originally scheduled to be released in the United States on January 12, 2018. In May 2017, the film was pushed back two months to March 23, 2018. In the UK, it was released on May 11, 2018.

Marketing
On November 3, 2017, seven teaser posters were released. The same day, the title was shortened from Gnomeo & Juliet 2: Sherlock Gnomes to Sherlock Gnomes. On November 7, the first trailer was revealed.

The film had also released posters parodying previous films from 2017, such as Darkest Hour, The Disaster Artist, The Greatest Showman, The Post, I, Tonya, Guardians of the Galaxy Vol. 2, All the Money in the World, Wonder Woman, and The Shape of Water. The posters had different names.

Home media
Sherlock Gnomes was released on Digital HD on June 5, 2018, and was released on Blu-ray and DVD on June 12, 2018.

Reception

Box office
Sherlock Gnomes has grossed $43.2 million in the United States and Canada, and $47.1 million in other territories, for a worldwide total of $90.4 million, against a production budget of $59 million.

In the United States and Canada, Sherlock Gnomes was released alongside Pacific Rim Uprising, Midnight Sun, Unsane and Paul, Apostle of Christ, and was projected to gross $13–18million from 3,600 theaters in its opening weekend. It ended up debuting to $10.6 million, underperforming but still finishing 4th at the box office.

Critical response

The website's critical consensus read, "Sherlock Gnomes is sadly, utterly stumped by the mystery of the reason of its own existence." On Metacritic, the film had a weighted average score of 36 out of 100, based on 14 critics, indicating "generally unfavorable reviews". Audiences polled by CinemaScore gave the film an average grade of "B+" on an A+ to F scale.

Accolades

See also
 Gnome Alone, another garden gnome film also released in 2018

References

External links

 
 
 
 
 

2018 films
2010s English-language films
2018 3D films
2018 computer-animated films
2010s American animated films
2010s comedy mystery films
American children's animated adventure films
American children's animated comedy films
American children's animated fantasy films
American children's animated musical films
American computer-animated films
American fantasy adventure films
American romantic comedy films
British 3D films
British animated fantasy films
British children's animated films
British children's comedy films
British children's fantasy films
British computer-animated films
British fantasy adventure films
British romantic comedy films
2010s children's fantasy films
Animated crossover films
2010s fantasy comedy films
Films about gnomes
Films based on Romeo and Juliet
Films based on multiple works
Films set in England
Films set in London
Films directed by John Stevenson
Metro-Goldwyn-Mayer films
Metro-Goldwyn-Mayer animated films
Paramount Animation films
Paramount Pictures films
Paramount Pictures animated films
Sherlock Holmes films
Rocket Pictures films
3D animated films
2018 romantic comedy films
2010s British films